Flash Gordon is the ninth studio album and first soundtrack album by the British rock band Queen, released on 8 December 1980 by EMI Records in the UK and on 27 January 1981 by Elektra Records in the US. It is one of two film soundtracks that they produced, along with Highlander. It is the soundtrack to the science fiction film Flash Gordon and features lyrics on only two tracks. "Flash's Theme" was the only single to be released from the album, under the title "Flash". The album reached number 10 on the UK charts and number 23 in the US. The album was reissued worldwide on 27 June 2011 (excluding the US and Canada, where it was released on 27 September) as part of the band's 40th anniversary. The reissue adds an EP of related tracks.

Unlike most soundtrack albums, audio from the film is prominently used in the theme song and the score selections of the album.

Track listing 
All tracks are instrumental unless noted.

Personnel 
Queen
Freddie Mercury – lead and backing vocals, synthesizers
Brian May – lead guitar, backing vocals, synthesizers, piano, organ, co-lead vocals on "Flash's Theme"
Roger Taylor – drums, timpani, backing vocals, synthesizers
John Deacon – bass guitar, guitar, synthesizers

Additional personnel
Howard Blake – additional orchestral arrangements

Charts

Weekly charts

Year-end

Certifications

References

External links 
Queen official website: Discography: Flash Gordon: includes lyrics of "Flash's Theme" (all versions) and "The Hero".
 Official Video (YouTube)

Queen (band) soundtracks
Science fiction film soundtracks
Single-artist film soundtracks
Flash Gordon
Albums produced by Reinhold Mack
1980 soundtrack albums
Elektra Records soundtracks
Hollywood Records soundtracks
EMI Records soundtracks
Parlophone soundtracks